Acacia simmonsiana, commonly known as Simmons wattle or desert manna wattle, is a shrub belonging to the genus Acacia and the subgenus Phyllodineae native to south eastern Australia.

Description
It has smooth or finely fissured bark that is a dark greyish brown colour. It has glabrous green phyllodes with an oblanceolate or sometimes narrowly oblong-elliptic shape. The shrub blooms between September and October. It produces simple inflorescences that occur singly or in pairs in the axils.

Taxonomy
The species was first formally described by the botanists Michael O'Leary and Bruce Maslin in 2002 as part of the work  Acacia simmonsiana (Leguminosae: Mimosoideae: Sect. Phyllodineae), a new species from south-eastern Australia as published in the Journal of the Adelaide Botanic Gardens. The specific epithet honours Marion and John Simmons, who have consistently promoted and written about Acacias and have been havily involved with the Australian Plant Society.

Distribution
It is endemic to a large area with the bulk of the population found from around Kangaroo Island through to Bordertown in South Australia extending into the Little Desert and Big Desert areas of north western Victoria and south central parts of New South Wales to around West Wyalong. It is often situated in undulating country in the depressions growing in loamy soils over limestone as a part of open scrubland or mallee communities.

See also
 List of Acacia species

References

simmonsiana
Flora of New South Wales
Flora of Victoria (Australia)
Flora of South Australia
Plants described in 2002
Taxa named by Bruce Maslin